Arno Surminski (born 20 August 1934 in Jäglack, East Prussia) is a German writer, living in Hamburg, a father of three and a grandfather of 8.

After growing up in East Prussia, his parents were deported to the Soviet Union, while he was expelled to Schleswig-Holstein. Having finished his school education there, he was apprenticed to a lawyer from 1950-1953.

He lived in Canada from 1957 to 1960, but then came back to Germany, where he worked for an insurance company from 1962 until 1972.

Since 1972, apart from writing, he has been working as a journalist, specialising in economy and insurance. His fame is mainly due to his novels, the principal themes of which are his recollections of a happy childhood and the fate of the deportees; he has no interest however in revenge, but only wants to preserve his childhood memories. Several of his books were used for TV productions.

Since 2001, he has been working as an ombudsman in the field of health insurance.

Books by Surminski

 Jokehnen oder Wie lange fährt man von Ostpreußen nach Deutschland? 
 Aus dem Nest gefallen
 Kudenow oder An fremden Wassern weinen
 Fremdes Land oder Als die Freiheit noch zu haben war
 Wie Königsberg im Winter
 Polninken oder Eine deutsche Liebe
 Grunowen oder das vergangene Leben
 Gewitter im Januar
 Malojawind. Eine Liebesgeschichte
 Aus dem Leben eines Buchhändlers
 Das dunkle Ende des Regenbogens
 Damals in Poggenwalde
 Kein schöner Land
 Besuch aus Stralsund
 Sommer 44 oder Wie lange fährt man von Deutschland nach Ostpreußen?
 Die masurischen Könige
 Eine gewisse Karriere
 Die Kinder von Moorhusen
 Der Winter der Tiere
 Vaterland ohne Väter
 Gruschelke und Engelmanke
 Die Vogelwelt von Auschwitz, 
 Das alte Ostpreussen

Awards 
1978 Andreas Gryphius Prize
1982 Kulturpreis der Landsmannschaft Ostpreußen für Literatur
1993 Hamburger Bürgerpreis
2001 Lessing-Ring zusammen mit dem Kulturpreis der deutschen Freimaurer
2004 Friedrich-Schiedel-Literaturpreis der Stadt Bad Wurzach; Biermann-Ratjen-Medaille der Freien und Hansestadt Hamburg
2008 Hannelore Greve Literature Prize

External links 

 
 
 arno-surminski.de

1934 births
Living people
People from East Prussia

German male writers
Recipients of the Cross of the Order of Merit of the Federal Republic of Germany
People from Kętrzyn County